Pepper  LaBeija (November 5, 1948 – May 14, 2003) was an American drag queen and fashion designer. LaBeija was known as "the last remaining queen of the Harlem drag balls".

Early life and career
LaBeija was born in The Bronx. While LaBeija identified as male, she preferred to be referred to by the feminine pronoun she. In 1981, she took over from Crystal LaBeija as the head of the ball culture House of LaBeija (from which her surname was derived). She remained the head (known as "the Mother") for over 20 years.

LaBeija competed in numerous drag balls and was known for her Egyptian-inspired runway performances. Over the course of her career, she won approximately 250 trophies. To earn money, she  produced drag balls and taught modeling.

Later years and death
LaBeija and her companion Pamela Jackson had a daughter together, and LaBeija devoted much of her time to her family, raising her daughter and stepson. In 1992, Pamela Jackson died. As LaBeija's health declined, her children lived with their maternal grandmother.
 
LaBeija suffered from diabetes mellitus type 2 and had both feet amputated as a result. She was largely bedridden for the last 10 years of her life. On May 14, 2003, LaBeija died of a heart attack at Roosevelt Hospital in Manhattan at the age of 54.

In popular culture
LaBeija is best known for her appearances in the documentary films Paris Is Burning (1990) and How Do I Look? (2006).

LaBeija also made appearances on The Joan Rivers Show (1991), TV Transvestites (1982), and The Queen (1968).

Malcolm McLaren quoted LaBeija in 1989 song and music video "Deep in Vogue", a tribute to the New York gay balls of the 1980s, runway competitions that involved dance, fashion, and attitude.

See also
 LGBT culture in New York City
 List of LGBT people from New York City

References

External links

Sally's Hideaway history

1948 births
2003 deaths
African-American drag queens
African-American fashion designers
American fashion designers
American amputees
Bisexual entertainers
American drag queens
LGBT African Americans
LGBT fashion designers
LGBT people from New York (state)
People from the Bronx
House of LaBeija
20th-century African-American people
21st-century African-American people
20th-century American LGBT people
21st-century American LGBT people